Hin or HIN may refer to:

People 
 Cornelis Hin (1869–1944), Dutch Olympic sailor
 Frans Hin (1906–1968), Dutch Olympic sailor
 Johan Hin (1899–1957), Dutch Olympic sailor

Science and technology
 Hin recombinase, a protein
 Hin, an ancient Egyptian unit of volume; see hekat
 Hin, a Biblical and Talmudic unit of measurement

Transportation
 Hindley railway station, in England
 Hinton station (West Virginia), an Amtrak station
 Sacheon Airport, in South Korea
 Hull number, or hull identification number

Other uses
 hin, the ISO 639-2 and 639-3 code for the language Hindi
 Hot Import Nights, automobile shows
  HIN (Healthcare Identification Number), US identifier

See also
 Hinn, a surname